Sanabares II (160-175 CE) was an Indo-Parthian ruler of Sakastan. Sanabares II ruled the newly established Kingdom of Sakastan, following the partition of the remains of the Indo-Parthian kingdom into the realms of Sakastan and Turan. The kingdom of Sakastan covers the period from 160 to 230 CE. The kingdom of Turan was ruled by another king named Pahares I (160-230 CE). 

Sanabares I succeeded in Sakastan the last of the major Indo-Parthian kings, Sanabares, in 160 CE.

The Kingdoms of Turan and Sakastan ended when they submitted to the Sasanian ruler Ardeshir I circa 230 CE. These events were recorded by Al-Tabari, describing the arrival of envoys to Ardeshir at Gor:

References

Indo-Parthian kings
3rd-century monarchs in Asia
3rd-century Iranian people